Clifford John Kliewer (December 29, 1927 – July 8, 1987) was a Canadian football player who played for the Calgary Stampeders. He won the Grey Cup with the Stampeders in 1948. The son of John and Ellen Kliewer, he previously played junior football in Winnipeg, Manitoba. He died in 1987 of heart disease.

References

1927 births
1987 deaths
Canadian football people from Winnipeg
Players of Canadian football from Manitoba
Calgary Stampeders players